Count Orlok, commonly known as Nosferatu, is the main antagonist and title character portrayed by German actor Max Schreck (1879–1936) in the silent film Nosferatu, eine Symphonie des Grauens (1922). He was based on Bram Stoker's character Count Dracula.

Profile
In Nosferatu, Count Orlok is a vampire from Transylvania, and is known as "The Bird of Death", who feasts upon the blood of living humans. He is believed to have been created by Belial, the lieutenant demon of Satan.

Orlok dwells alone in a vast castle hidden among the rugged peaks in a lost corner of the Carpathian Mountains. The castle is swathed in shadows, and is badly neglected with a highly sinister feel to it. He is in league with the housing agent Knock, and wants to purchase a house in the (fictional) city of Wisborg, Germany. Local peasants live in terror of Orlok and never venture out after dark. Thomas Hutter scorns their fears as mere superstition, and ventures to the decrepit castle; however, the coach-driver will not take him over the bridge leading to it. A black-swathed figure in a black coach (Orlok in disguise) drives him the rest of the way. He is greeted by Orlok, who claims that as it is past midnight all his servants have gone to bed, and the two dine together and discuss Orlok's purchasing of the aforementioned house. Hutter accidentally cuts his thumb when slicing bread and Orlok is barely able to control himself from drinking from Hutter's wound. After Hutter collapses in a chair, Orlok feeds off of him, but this is not shown on screen: Hutter discovers two bites on his neck the next day but attributes them to mosquitoes, unaware at this point that his host is in reality, a vampire.

Hutter only realises the horrific truth later in his chambers after further reading from The Book of the Vampires, and he discovers that he is trapped in the castle with the Nosferatu. Orlok advances upon Hutter, and Hutter's beloved wife, Ellen, senses through telepathy that her husband's life is in mortal danger; she screams for him and somehow Orlok is powerless to touch him. The next morning Hutter searches the castle, and discovers to his revulsion that Orlok is "sleeping" in the basement in a filthy coffin filled with earth. Hutter then witnesses Orlok loading a cart with several coffins filled with soil, one of which he then hides in and they are driven off to be loaded onto a ship headed for Wisborg. This soil is later revealed to be unhallowed earth from Orlok's own grave; according to The Book of the Vampires, Nosferatu must sleep by day in the unholy earth from their graves to sustain their power.

On board the ship, he kills every crew member until only the captain and his first mate remain. Later when the first mate goes to the cargo hold to investigate, Count Orlok rises from his coffin, terrifying the first mate who jumps overboard in fear. The captain ties himself to the wheel of the ship and then Count Orlok creeps up on him and kills the captain. His journey by sea spreads plague throughout Europe.

Upon his arrival in Wisborg, Orlok infests the city with rats that sleep in his coffins, and countless people fall victim to the plague, forcing the local authorities to declare a quarantine and provoking hysteria among the citizens. Rather than come back as vampires, however, his victims simply die. Ellen and Hutter know the causes of the plague but fear they are powerless to stop the vampire. Ellen watches sullenly as lines of coffins are carried through the empty streets, and she realises Orlok must be stopped. Ellen learns from The Book of the Vampires that – rather than a stake through the heart – the Nosferatu can only be vanquished if a woman pure in heart willingly allows him to feed off her long enough to prevent him from seeking shelter from sunrise. Ellen coaxes Orlok to her room and lies in bed whilst he drinks from her neck. The sun rises, and Orlok is burned away in a cloud of smoke. Knock is able to sense Orlok is dead. Ellen dies soon after.

Legacy
 Orlok's name was referred to in the form of Byron Orlok, Boris Karloff's character in Peter Bogdanovich's Targets, featuring Karloff in a role as an aging horror film star.
 Orlok makes an appearance as an incidental antagonist in Jonathan Green's ACE gamebook Dracula: Curse of the Vampire.
 Orlok appears briefly at the end of the Spongebob Squarepants episode "Graveyard Shift" where the episode's main characters erroneously refer to him as Nosferatu. His appearance was regarded by many critics as a highlight of the episode and a great example of the show's nonsensical yet enjoyable humor. The character has made several appearances in the Nickelodeon series since, and has a younger version on the spinoff Kamp Koral: SpongeBob's Under Years as Kidferatu.
 The 2021 Doctor Who spin-off series P.R.O.B.E. Case Files featured Orlok in the episode Living Fiction, using footage of Nosferatu. In the story, the vampire comes to life after a film-reel of the original movie comes in contact with an alien entity. Released on DVD by BBV Productions in 2022.
 The 2022 film The Munsters features a character called Orlock (portrayed by Richard Brake) who was intended to serve as a tribute to Count Orlok. He served as one of Lily Gruesella's dates which did not go well.
 Orlok will be played by Bill Skarsgård in the upcoming remake of Nosferatu.

See also
 Count Dracula
 Elizabeth Báthory
 Kurt Barlow
 The Master (Buffy the Vampire Slayer)
 Nosferatu the Vampyre (Nosferatu, Phantom der Nacht'')
 Varney the Vampire

References

Nosferatu
Film characters introduced in 1922
Fictional counts and countesses
Fictional mass murderers
Fictional Romanian people
Fictional vampires
Male horror film villains